Zsolt Nagy (born 25 May 1993) is a Hungarian professional footballer who plays for Puskás Akadémia FC.

Club career
He started his career in Felcsút FC and then in 2011 he was signed by the partner team of Felcsút, Videoton FC. However, he could not earn any appearances during his two year at Videoton. Therefore, he was loaned to Nemzeti Bajnokság II club Puskás Akadémia FC of Felcsút, where he could play 8 matches in the 2012–13 Nemzeti Bajnokság II season. His short spell convinced the owner of the club and he was purchased in 2013.

He debuted in the Nemzeti Bajnokság I in 2013, when Puskás Akadémia was promoted to the first division.

In the 2017–18 season he was loaned to Csákvári TK.

Since Zsolt Hornyák's appointment as the manager of Puskás Akadémia, he has become a stable member of the squad earning 25, 27, and 28 caps in the 2019–20, 2020–21, and 2021–22 seasons, respectively.

International career
He made his debut for Hungary national football team on 15 November 2019 in a friendly against Uruguay. He substituted Mihály Korhut in the 75th minute.

On 11 June 2022, he scored his first goal against Germany in the 2022–23 UEFA Nations League A match at the Puskás Aréna. The match ended with a 1–1 draw.

Career statistics

Club statistics

Updated to games played as of 15 May 2022.

International

 
Scores and results list Hungary's goal tally first, score column indicates score after each Nagy goal.

References

 MLSZ 
 HLSZ 
 
 

1993 births
Living people
Sportspeople from Székesfehérvár
Hungarian footballers
Hungary international footballers
Association football midfielders
FC Felcsút players
Fehérvár FC players
Puskás Akadémia FC players
Csákvári TK players
Nemzeti Bajnokság I players